The Walk-Offs is a 1920 silent film comedy directed by Herbert Blaché and starring May Allison. It was produced by Maxwell Karger and distributed through Metro Pictures. It was based on a 1918 Broadway play, The Walk-offs, by Fanny and Frederic Hatton.

Cast
May Allison - Kathleen Rutherford
Emory Johnson - Robert Winston
Effie Conley - Caroline Rutherford
Darrell Foss - Schuyler Rutherford
Joseph Kilgour - Murray Van Allan
Richard Morris - Judge Brent
Kathleen Kerrigan - Mary Carter
Marie Pavis - Sonia (*as Yvonne Pavis)
Claire Du Brey - Mrs. Elliott
Estelle Evans - Mrs. Asterbilt

Preservation status
No prints are known to exist of this film.

Gallery

References

External links

1920 films
Lost American films
American silent feature films
Films directed by Herbert Blaché
Metro Pictures films
American black-and-white films
Silent American comedy films
1920 comedy films
1920 lost films
Lost comedy films
1920s American films